Polo-like kinase 3 (Drosophila), also known as PLK3, is an enzyme which in humans is encoded by the PLK3 gene.

Function 

Cytokine-inducible kinase is a putative serine/threonine kinase.  CNK contains both a catalytic domain and a putative regulatory domain.  It may play a role in regulation of cell cycle progression and tumorigenesis.

Interactions 

PLK3 has been shown to interact with:
 CDC25C, 
 CHEK2,  and
 P53.

References

Further reading 

 
 
 
 
 
 
 
 
 
 
 
 
 
 
 
 
 
 
 

EC 2.7.11